Swedish singer and songwriter Tove Lo has released five studio albums, one extended play (EP), 25 singles (including 14 as a featured artist), seven promotional singles and 37 music videos. Lo started her career as the lead singer and songwriter in math rock band Tremblebee from 2006 until 2009.  In 2011, she signed a publishing deal with Warner/Chappell Music, and started recording songs. She self-released "Love Ballad" as her debut single in October 2012. The next year, Lo released "Habits", which received positive feedback from music blogs and led her to sign a record deal with Universal Music Group. Lo's first EP, Truth Serum, was released under the label on 3 March 2014, and entered the top 20 in Norway and Sweden. Three singles were released from the EP, including a remixed version of "Habits" by production duo Hippie Sabotage, re-titled as "Stay High". The track peaked at number 13 in Sweden and reached the top ten of the charts in Australia, New Zealand, and the United Kingdom.

Lo's debut album, Queen of the Clouds, was released on 30 September 2014 in the United States, to generally positive reviews. It peaked at number six in Sweden and number 14 on the US Billboard 200, and received platinum certifications in both countries. "Habits" was re-issued as "Habits (Stay High)" and released as the lead single from the record. A sleeper hit in the United States, it peaked at number three on the Billboard Hot 100, and received a quintuple platinum certification by the Recording Industry Association of America (RIAA). In doing so, it became the highest-charting song by a Swedish act on the Billboard Hot 100 since "The Sign" by Ace of Base peaked at number one in 1994. Lo later collaborated with Swedish DJ Alesso in the song "Heroes (We Could Be)" in 2014, which became her highest-charting single in Sweden, peaking at number 5. 

In early 2016, Lo appeared as a featured artist on "Close" by American singer Nick Jonas, and "Say It" by Australian DJ Flume. On 28 October of that year, the singer released her second studio album, Lady Wood, which topped the albums chart in Sweden and peaked at number 11 on the US Billboard 200. Its lead single, "Cool Girl", entered the top 30 in Australia, New Zealand and Sweden. On 17 November 2017, Lo released her third studio album, Blue Lips, which peaked at number 15 in Sweden and charted in Canada, Netherlands, Norway, and the United States. On 20 September 2019, Lo released her fourth studio album, "Sunshine Kitty". The album's lead single, "Glad He's Gone", was nominated for the Best Music Video Award at the 62nd Grammy Awards.

Albums

Studio albums

Reissues

Compilations

Extended plays

Singles

As lead artist

As featured artist

Promotional singles

Other charted songs

Guest appearances

Songwriting credits

Music videos

Footnotes
Notes for albums and songs

Notes for peak chart positions

References

External links
 
 
 
 

Discography
Discographies of Swedish artists
Pop music discographies